General elections were held in the Solomon Islands on 24 October 1984. A total of 230 candidates contested the elections, the result of which was a victory for the Solomon Islands United Party, which won 13 of the 38 seats, despite receiving fewer votes than the People's Alliance Party.

Results
Eighteen incumbent MPs lost their seats, including eight ministers.

Aftermath
Following the elections, Peter Kenilorea was elected Prime Minister on 24 October, defeating Solomon Mamaloni by 21 votes to 13. All twelve People's Alliance Party MPs and the sole National Democratic Party MP voted for Mamaloni, while the thirteen Solomon Islands United Party MPs, four Solomon Agu Segu-Fenua MPs and four independents voted for Kenilorea.

References

Solomons
General
Elections in the Solomon Islands
Election and referendum articles with incomplete results